An environmental tax, ecotax (short for ecological taxation), or green tax is a tax levied on activities which are considered to be harmful to the environment and is intended to promote environmentally friendly activities via economic incentives. A notable example is carbon tax. Such a policy can complement or avert the need for regulatory (command and control) approaches. Often, an ecotax policy proposal may attempt to maintain overall tax revenue by proportionately reducing other taxes (e.g. taxes on human labor and renewable resources); such proposals are known as a green tax shift towards ecological taxation. Ecotaxes address the failure of free markets to consider environmental impacts.

Ecotaxes are examples of Pigouvian taxes, which are taxes that attempt to make the private parties involved feel the social burden of their actions. An example might be philosopher Thomas Pogge's proposed Global Resources Dividend.

Taxes affected

Examples of taxes which could be lowered or eliminated by a green tax shift are:
 Payroll, income, and, to a lesser extent, sales taxes.
 Corporate taxes (taxes on investment and entrepreneurship).
 Property taxes on buildings and other infrastructure.

Examples of ecotaxes which could be implemented or increased are:
 Carbon taxes on the use of fossil fuels by greenhouse gases produced. Old hydrocarbon taxes don't penalize greenhouse gas (GHG) production.
 Duties on imported goods containing significant non-ecological energy input (to a level necessary to treat fairly local manufacturers)
 Severance taxes on the extraction of mineral, energy, and forestry products.
 License fees for camping, hiking, fishing and hunting and associated equipment.
 Specific taxes on technologies and products which are associated with substantial negative externalities.
 Waste disposal taxes and refundable fees.
 Steering taxes on effluents, pollution and other hazardous wastes.
 Site value taxes on the unimproved value of land.

Economic frameworks and strategies employing tax shifting
The object of a green tax shift is often to implement a "full cost accounting" or "true cost accounting", using fiscal policy to internalize market distorting externalities, which leads to sustainable wealth creation. The broader measures required for this are also sometimes called ecological fiscal reform, especially in Canada, where the government has generally employed this terminology. In some countries the name is eco-social market economy.

Tax shifting usually includes balancing taxation levels to be revenue-neutral for government and to maintain overall progressiveness. It also usually includes measures to protect the most vulnerable, such as raising the minimum income to file income tax at all, or an increase to pension and social assistance levels to offset increased costs of fuel consumption.

Basic economic theory recognizes the existence of externalities and their potential negative effects. To the extent that green taxes correct for externalities such as pollution, they correspond with mainstream economic theory. In practice, however, setting the correct taxation level or the tax collection system needed to do so is difficult, and may lead to further distortions or unintended consequences.

Taxes on consumption may take the "feebate" approach advocated by Amory Lovins, in which additional fees on less sustainable products—such as sport utility vehicles—are pooled to fund subsidies on more sustainable alternatives, such as hybrid electric vehicles.

However, they may simply act as incentives to change habits and make capital investments in newer more efficient vehicles or appliances or to upgrade buildings. Small changes in corporate tax rates for instance can radically change return on investment of capital projects, especially if the averted costs of future fossil fuel use are taken into account.

The same logic applies to major consumer purchases. A "green mortgage" such as a Location Efficient Mortgage, for example, recognizes that persons who do not drive cars and live generally energy-efficient lifestyles pay far less per month than others and accordingly have more to pay a heftier mortgage bill with. This justifies lending them much more money to upgrade a house to use even less energy overall. The result is a bank taking more per month from a consumer's income as utilities and car insurance companies take less, and housing stock upgraded to use the minimum energy feasible with current technology.

Aside from energy, the refits will generally be those required to be maximally accommodating to remote work, permaculture gardens (for example green roofs), and a lifestyle that is generally localized in the community not based on commuting. It raises real estate valuations for not only the neighborhood but the entire surrounding region. Consumers living sustainable lifestyles in upgraded housing will generally be unwilling to drive around aimlessly shopping, for instance, to save a few dollars on their purchases. Instead, they'll stay nearer to home and create jobs in grocery delivery and small organic grocers, spending substantially less money on gasoline and car operation costs even if they pay more for food.

Progressive or regressive?
Some green tax shift proposals have been criticized as being fiscally regressive (a tax with an average tax rate that decreases as the taxpayer's income increases). Taxing negative externalities usually entails exerting a burden on consumption, and since the poor consume more and save or invest less as a share of their income, so that any shift towards consumption taxes can be regressive. In 2004, research by the Policy Studies Institute and Joseph Rowntree Foundation indicated that flat rate taxes on domestic rubbish, energy, water and transport use would have a relatively higher impact on poorer households.

However, conventional regulatory approaches can affect prices in much the same way, while lacking the revenue-recycling potential of ecotaxes. Moreover, correctly assessing distributive impact of any tax shift requires an analysis of the specific instrument design features. For example, tax revenue could be redistributed on a per capita basis as part of a basic income scheme; in this case, the poorest would gain what the average citizen pays as ecotaxes, minus their own small contribution (no car, small apartment, ...). This design would be highly progressive. Alternatively, an ecotax can have a "lifeline" design, in which modest consumption levels are priced relatively low (even zero, in the case of water), and higher consumption levels are priced at a higher rate. Furthermore, an ecotax policy package can include revenue recycling to reduce or eliminate any regressivity; an increase in an ecotax could be more than offset by a decrease in a (regressive) payroll or consumption tax. Some proponents claim a second benefit of increased employment or lower health care costs as the market and society adjust to the new fiscal policy (these claims, as with the claim "tax cuts create jobs," are often difficult to prove or disprove even after the fact).

Furthermore, pollution and other forms of environmental harm are often felt more acutely by the poor, who cannot "buy their way out" of being receptors of air pollution, water pollution, etc. Such losses, although externalities, have real economic welfare impacts. Thus by reducing environmental harm, such instruments have a progressive effect.

Ecotax policies enacted

An ecotax has been enacted in Germany by means of three laws in 1998, 1999 and 2002. The first introduced a tax on electricity and petroleum, at variable rates based on environmental considerations; renewable sources of electricity were not taxed. The second adjusted the taxes to favor efficient conventional power plants. The third increased the tax on petroleum. At the same time, income taxes were reduced proportionally so that the total tax burden remained constant.

The regional government of Balearic Islands (then held by an ecosocialist coalition) established an ecotax in 1999. The Balearic Island suffer a high human pressure from tourism, that at the same time provides the main source of income. The tax (€1.00 per person per day) would be paid by visitors staying at tourist resorts. This was criticized by the conservative opposition as contrary to business interests, and they abolished the tax in 2003 after seizing back the government.

A variety of ecotaxes (often called "severance taxes") have been enacted by various states in the United States. The Supreme Court of the United States held in Commonwealth Edison Co. v. Montana, 453 U.S. 609 (1981), that in the absence of federal law to the contrary, states may set ecotaxes as high as they wish without violating the Commerce Clause or the Supremacy Clause of the United States Constitution.

Registration taxes
The Netherlands, Portugal, Canada, Spain and Finland have introduced differentiations into their car registration taxes to encourage car buyers to opt for the cleanest car models.

In the Netherlands, the new registration taxes, payable when a car is sold to its first buyer, can earn the owner of a hybrid a discount up to €6000. Spain reduced taxes for cars that produced less CO2 (some of which will be exempted), while the more consuming, like SUVs and 4WDs saw their taxes increased.

Austria has had a registration tax based on fuel consumption for several years.

Worldwide implementation

United Kingdom
In 1993, the conservative government introduced the Fuel Price Escalator, featuring a small but steady increase of fuel taxes, as proposed by Weizsäcker and Jesinghaus in 1992. The FPE was stopped in 2000, following nationwide protests; while fuel was relatively cheap in 1993, fuel prices were then among the highest in Europe.
Under the 1997–2007 Labour government, despite Gordon Brown’s promise to the contrary, green taxes as a percentage of overall taxes had actually fallen from 9.4% to 7.7%, according to calculations by Friends of the Earth.

In a 2006 proposal, the U.K.'s then-Environment Secretary David Miliband had the government in discussions on the use of various green taxes to reduce climate-changing pollution. Of the proposed taxes, which were meant to be revenue-neutral, Miliband stated: "They're not fundamentally there to raise revenue."

Miliband provided additional comments on their need, saying: "Changing people's behaviour is only achieved by "market forces and price signals", and "As our understanding of climate change increases, it is clear more needs to be done."

Ukraine
Starting in 1999, the Ukrainian government has been collecting an ecological tax, officially known as Environmental Pollution Fee, which is collected from all polluting entities, whether it's one-time or ongoing pollution and regardless of whether the polluting act was legal or illegal at the time.

India
The Ministry of Environment and Forests, Government of India, asked Madras School of Economics, Chennai, to undertake a study of taxes on polluting inputs and outputs in 2001. Raja Chelliah, Paul Appasamy, U.Sankar and Rita Pandey (Academic Foundation, 2007, New Delhi) recommended eco taxes on coal, automobiles, chlorine, phosphate detergents, chemical pesticides, chemical fertilizers, lead acid batteries and plastics. See Ecotaxes on polluting inputs and outputs, Academic Foundation, New Delhi,2007. The Finance Minister introduced a coal cess at the rate of Rs 50 per ton in 2010.

France

The French government shared its intentions to establish a new fee on plane tickets with the purpose to fund environment-friendly alternatives, such as eco-friendly transport infrastructure, including rail. The proposed tax would range between 1.50 euros ($1.7) and 18 euros ($20) and apply to most flights departing in France. The French government expects the new tax to raise over 180 million euros ($200 million) from 2020.

The Carbon tax 

The carbon tax was implemented in 2014 after two unsuccessful attempts. It is not a specific tax but a component of domestic consumption taxes on fossil fuels, proportional to their carbon content. It is based on the "polluter pays" principle, ‘’ according to which all persons must contribute to the repair of the damage they cause to the environment ‘’. It puts a price on each ton of  emitted to encourage consumers to move away from certain products or behaviors with high greenhouse gas emissions. In other words, to reduce the use of fossil fuels. It is a Pigouvian tax that encourages quantifying the costs of negative externalities of goods and services.

The carbon tax is in fact a "carbon component" integrated into the more global calculation of the domestic consumption tax on energy products (TICPE), natural gas (TICGN) and coal (TICC).
The carbon tax takes the form of a fee ratger than a tax or an environmental tax in the strict sense of the word. It is a non-mandatory levy paid only by the use of a polluting service or good

Tax payers 
The tax is paid by households (on gasoline or gas for example), companies and administrations. However, there are many exceptions: the most polluting large industries are subject to European regulations; air and sea transport are exempted by virtue of international agreements and European directives; national river transport, cabs, road transport of goods, public transport as well as agricultural uses are also exempted from this tax.

Results 

Reception by the public 
The rapid increase in this tax (from 7 euros per ton in 2014 to 14 in 2015 and 44.6 euros in 2018) caused gasoline prices to explode, which, coupled with the increase in the price of petroleum products and natural gas, contributed to the birth of the yellow vest movement. 
Other debates take place on the transparency of the tax, indeed, although the receipts are estimated at 8 billion euros per year, the citizens do not really know what is done with it, which makes it even more difficult to accept.

See also

References

External links
 Green Taxes, encyclopedia.com
 Environmental taxation, Encyclopedia of the Environment
 carbon tax, britannica.com
 Sightline Institute's research and resources on green taxes
 A Distributional Analysis of Green Tax Reforms - Gilbert E. Metcalf
 STERN REVIEW: The Economics of Climate Change - An executive summary of a report by economist Nicholas Stern (27pg pdf file)
 Climate change fight 'can't wait', 2006, bbc.co.uk -- on economist Sir Nicholas Stern's report
 Environmental Accounting: Environmentally related transfers - environmental taxes, umweltgesamtrechnung.at
 Sweden - Ecological Tax Reform, ecotippingpoints.org

 
Environmental law